William Haslam Smith (October 12, 1891 – August 15, 1958) was a Canadian businessman and political figure in Nova Scotia. He represented Lunenburg County in the Nova Scotia House of Assembly from 1925 to 1928 as a Liberal-Conservative member.

Early life and education
He was born in Lunenburg, Nova Scotia, the son of William Charles Smith, and was educated in Luneburg, Halifax and Belleville, Ontario.

Career
Smith was vice-president of Lunenburg Sea Products, which operated a fish processing plant. He lived in Lunenburg but later moved to North Vancouver.

Personal life
In 1921, Smith married Mary Gwendolyn Pugsley.

References 
 A Directory of the Members of the Legislative Assembly of Nova Scotia, 1758-1958, Public Archives of Nova Scotia (1958)

1891 births
Year of death missing
Progressive Conservative Association of Nova Scotia MLAs